Luis Fernando Muriel Fruto (born 16 April 1991) is a Colombian professional footballer who plays as a forward for  club Atalanta and the Colombia national team.

Having started his professional career with Colombian side Deportivo Cali, Muriel joined Udinese. His first two seasons at the club saw him loaned out to Granada and Lecce respectively before returning to the club in 2012, during which year he won the Serie A Best Young Revelation award alongside Stephan El Shaarawy. After scoring 15 league goals in 57 appearances, Muriel joined fellow Serie A side Sampdoria in January 2015. He spent two-and-a-half seasons with the club, scoring 21 goals in 79 league appearances before joining Sevilla in 2017. In January 2019, he was sent back to Italy on loan with Fiorentina. In June 2019, Muriel signed for Serie A side Atalanta for a reported €18m. In his first season, Muriel secured 18 league goals and guided Atalanta to UEFA Champions League qualification for the first time in the club's history. The following season, he finished as the third top goalscorer in the Serie A, behind  Romelu Lukaku and Cristiano Ronaldo. Consequently, Atalanta qualified for two consecutive Champions League tournaments; for his efforts, Muriel was included in the 2020–21 Serie A Team of the Year.

Muriel is currently a Colombian international, having represented his nation at a full international level since 2012. He made his senior debut in June 2012, in a World Cup qualifying match against Ecuador and scored his first goal the following year, netting against Guatemala. He later took part at the 2015, 2019, and 2021 editions of the Copa América, and the 2018 FIFA World Cup.

Club career

Deportivo Cali
Having spent his formative years with Atlético Junior, Muriel joined Colombian Primera A side Deportivo Cali in January 2009. He made his debut against Envigado FC on 12 July 2009 in what would be his only appearance for the year before scoring nine goals in 10 appearances the following season. Muriel's early form for Deportivo Cali, which included a hat-trick against Once Caldas in his third match, earned him the nickname "the Colombian Ronaldo", in comparison to former Brazil striker Ronaldo, and midway through the season he was signed by Italian Serie A side Udinese.

Udinese
Udinese officially completed the signing of Muriel on 30 May 2010 for a reported fee of €1.5m. In terms of the transfer agreement, Udinese obtained 70% of Muriel's playing rights with the remaining 30% being retained by Deportivo. Shortly after his arrival in Udine, however, he was loaned to Segunda División side Granada.

Loans to Granada & Lecce
Muriel completed his loan move to Granada on 12 July 2010. The club achieved promotion to La Liga for the first time in 35 years but it was an unsuccessful spell for Muriel, as he made only seven appearances for the season and failed to score.

Upon the expiration of his loan with Granada, Muriel was loaned out again for the following season to fellow Serie A side, Lecce. He made his debut for the club on 27 October 2011, coming on as a second-half substitute for Daniele Corvia in a 2–0 loss to Palermo. On his first start for the club the following month, against Cesena, Muriel was sent off for two bookable offences. Lecce hung on to claim a 1–0 victory, however, thanks to a goal from fellow countryman and Udinese-loanee, Juan Cuadrado. He improved to end the campaign with a return of seven goals in 29 appearances, though his efforts were not enough to prevent Lecce from being relegated to Serie B. His form during the course of the season garnered the attention of A.C. Milan and Internazionale, with both clubs making official offers to sign him, but Muriel confirmed that he would be returning to Udinese.

Return to Udinese
Muriel's poor physical condition upon his return to Udinese drew the ire of Francesco Guidolin, with the club manager insisting that he needed to lose , despite the player scoring four goals against Arta Cedarchis in a pre-season friendly. He was able to get in shape for the start of the season and made his debut in a 2–1 defeat against Fiorentina on 25 August 2012, providing the assist to Maicosuel for the opening goal. He signed a contract extension the following month, signing an improved five-year deal with the club. In January 2012, Muriel was awarded the Serie A Best Young Revelation award alongside Milan's Stephan El Shaarawy in recognition of his form with Lecce and Udinese the previous year. By the conclusion of the season, he had contributed a return of 11 goals in 22 Serie A appearances, despite having missed nearly four months of football because of a hairline fracture of his left femur.

The following season, in the qualifying playoff rounds of the 2013–14 UEFA Europa League, Muriel scored his first ever European goals, netting twice in a 3–1 victory over Široki Brijeg and in his first league match of the season, scored against reigning Coppa Italia champions, Lazio in a 2–1 loss. His form declined however, as he struggled with weight and injury issues, and over the course of the next season-and-a-half he scored only four goals in 35 league appearances, including a spell without any goals in 11 matches from the start of the 2014–15 Serie A season. He ultimately amassed 15 goals in 57 appearances for the club, before leaving to join Sampdoria in 2015.

Sampdoria
In spite of his struggles with Udinese, Sampdoria completed the double loan signings of Muriel and teammate Andrea Coda on 22 January 2015, with an obligation to purchase both players at the end of the season for a combined sum of €12m. In terms of the agreement, Muriel signed a contract with Sampdoria until 30 June 2019. He scored four times in 16 appearances during his loan spell before completing a permanent transfer at the end of the season. In his final campaign with the club he recorded a career best return of 11 league goals and five assists, which prompted Sevilla to break their club record to sign him at the end of the season.

Sevilla
On 11 July 2017, La Liga side Sevilla announced the signing of Muriel for a reported club-record fee €20m, with potential add-ons. He made his debut on 19 August, starting in a 1–1 draw with Espanyol and scored his first goal for the club on 17 September, netting the winner in a 1–0 victory over Girona.
Following a disappointing debut campaign, in which he only scored 9 goals in 46 appearances, Muriel found himself behind Wissam Ben Yedder and new club signings André Silva and Quincy Promes in the pecking order for Sevilla the following season.

Loan to Fiorentina
On 2 January 2019, Muriel returned to Serie A after signing with Fiorentina on loan for the remainder of the season. He scored a hat-trick on his non-competitive debut a week later in a win over Maltese side, Hibernians before making his official debut on 14 January in a 2–0 Coppa Italia win over Torino. He then scored twice on his league debut on 20 January during a 3–3 draw with former club, Sampdoria. He ultimately scored six league goals during his loan spell but was not signed permanently after the club underwent a change in ownership.

Atalanta
On 21 June 2019, after a successful loan spell with Fiorentina, Muriel returned to Serie A after signing with Atalanta in a permanent deal worth a reported €18m.

International career

Youth team
Muriel represented Colombia at U20 level and featured for the nation at the 2011 FIFA U-20 World Cup for which Colombia were the host nation. On 6 August 2011, having previously scored twice against France, he scored the only goal of the match as Colombia defeated Korea Republic 1–0 to progress from the group stages with a perfect record. Muriel ultimately scored four goals for the tournament before Colombia were knocked out by Mexico in the quarter-finals.

Senior team

Muriel was called up to the senior side for the first time in 2012 by new manager José Pékerman and made his debut in a 1–0 World Cup qualifier loss to Ecuador on 10 June. He scored his first goal the following year, scoring in a friendly against Guatemala on 6 February 2013. The following year, he was one of seven players cut from Colombia's extended squad for the 2014 FIFA World Cup in Brazil. He was a member of Colombia's squad for the 2015 Copa América but was overlooked for the Copa América Centenario the following year.

In May 2018 he was named in Colombia's preliminary 35-man squad for the 2018 FIFA World Cup in Russia. He featured sporadically as Colombia reached the Round of 16 where they were eliminated following a penalty shoot-out defeat to England.

The following summer, Muriel was included in the 23-man Colombia squad for the 2019 Copa América in Brazil.

On 9 July 2021, Muriel assisted Luis Diaz's match–winning goal in a 3–2 victory over Peru in the third-place match of the 2021 Copa América.

Style of play 
In his youth, Muriel was often praised in the media for his precocious performances during his early career in Italy, which led him to win the Serie A Best Young Revelation Award in 2012. Several footballing figures in Italy, such as manager Massimiliano Allegri, have recognised Muriel for his speed and technique on the ball, as well as the potential which he already demonstrated as a youngster; his former Udinese teammate Antonio Di Natale even compared him to Alexis Sánchez in 2013. Although Muriel is usually deployed as a centre-forward, he is a versatile forward, who is capable of playing in several offensive positions; indeed, during the 2012–13 season, under his former Udinese manager Francesco Guidolin, he also demonstrated his creative capabilities in a more withdrawn, central role behind another striker, which frequently saw him operate as either a second striker or attacking midfielder. He is also capable of playing as a winger. A fast, talented, creative, two-footed, and technically gifted striker, with good dribbling skills, pace, agility, acceleration, movement, and an eye for goal, Muriel's playing style, physical build, and appearance have led him to be compared to former Brazil striker Ronaldo. Muriel has stated that this comparison is likely due to the fact that, as a youngster, he was an admirer of Ronaldo during the latter's time with Inter Milan. Muriel went on to say that he supported Inter Milan because Ronaldo was playing for them at the time, and that he was initially a Milan fan. Coincidentally, Muriel also stated that, like his childhood idol, he also suffers from weight issues, and even had to lose five kg at one point during the 2012–13 season. This meant that he had to be consistent with his fitness regime, which enabled him to achieve a similar level of athletic ability to Ronaldo. Aside from Ronaldo, another one of Muriel's major influences as a footballer in his youth was compatriot Iván Valenciano. Despite his ability, he is also known to be inconsistent.

Career statistics

Club

International

Scores and results list Colombia's goal tally first, score column indicates score after each Muriel goal.

Honours
Colombia U20
Toulon Tournament: 2011

Individual

Serie A Best Young Revelation: 2012
Serie A Player of the Month: April 2021
Serie A Team of the Year: 2020–21

References

External links

Profile at the Atalanta B.C. website

Luis Muriel profile at Goalsreplay.com

1991 births
Living people
Colombian footballers
Colombia youth international footballers
Colombia under-20 international footballers
Colombia international footballers
Association football forwards
Categoría Primera A players
Segunda División players
Serie A players
La Liga players
Deportivo Cali footballers
Udinese Calcio players
Granada CF footballers
U.S. Lecce players
U.C. Sampdoria players
Sevilla FC players
ACF Fiorentina players
Atalanta B.C. players
Colombian expatriate footballers
Colombian expatriate sportspeople in Italy
Colombian expatriate sportspeople in Spain
Expatriate footballers in Italy
Expatriate footballers in Spain
2015 Copa América players
2018 FIFA World Cup players
2019 Copa América players
2021 Copa América players
People from Atlántico Department
Colombian people of African descent